Chondrilla is a genus of sea sponges belonging to the family Chondrillidae.

Species 
 Chondrilla acanthastra de Laubenfels, 1954
 Chondrilla australiensis Carter, 1873
 Chondrilla caribensis Rüztler, Duran & Piantoni, 2007
 Chondrilla euastra de Laubenfels, 1949
 Chondrilla grandistellata Thiele, 1899
 Chondrilla jinensis Hentschel, 1912
 Chondrilla kilakaria Kumar, 1925
 Chondrilla linnaei Fromont, Usher, Sutton, Toze & Kuo 2008
 Chondrilla mixta Schulze, 1877
 Chondrilla montanusa Carballo, Gomez, Cruz-Barraza & Flores-Sanchez, 2003
 Chondrilla nucula Schmidt, 1862
 Chondrilla oxyastera Tanita & Hoshino, 1989
 Chondrilla pacifica Carballo, Gomez, Cruz-Barraza & Flores-Sanchez, 2003
 Chondrilla sacciformis Carter, 1879
 Chondrilla secunda Lendenfeld, 1885
 Chondrilla verrucosa Desqueyroux-Faúndez & van Soest, 1997

References 

Tetractinomorpha
Taxa named by Eduard Oscar Schmidt